In 2019, the  participated in the 2019 Super Rugby competition, the 24th edition of the competition since its inception in 1996.

The Bulls won eight, drew two and lost six of their matches during the regular season of the competition to finish second in the South African Conference, and in 5th place overall to qualify for the finals as a wildcard team.

Personnel

Coaches and management

The Bulls coaching and management staff for the 2019 Super Rugby season were:

Squad

The following players were named in the Bulls squad for the 2019 Super Rugby season:

Standings

Round-by-round

The table below shows the Bulls' progression throughout the season. For each round, their cumulative points total is shown with the overall log position:

Matches

The Bulls played the following matches during the 2019 Super Rugby season:

Player statistics

The Super Rugby appearance record for players that represented the Bulls in 2019 is as follows:

(c) denotes the team captain. For each match, the player's squad number is shown. Starting players are numbered 1 to 15, while the replacements are numbered 16 to 23. "App" refers to the number of appearances made by the player, "Try" to the number of tries scored by the player, "Con" to the number of conversions kicked, "Pen" to the number of penalties kicked, "DG" to the number of drop goals kicked and "Pts" refer to the total number of points scored by the player.

 Matthys Basson, Marnitz Boshoff, Nick de Jager, Carel du Preez, Stedman Gans, Travis Ismaiel, Madot Mabokela, Theo Maree, Edgar Marutlulle, Duncan Matthews, Nqoba Mxoli, Hendré Stassen, Muller Uys and Jano Venter did not make any appearances

See also

 Bulls
 2019 Super Rugby season

References

2019
2019 Super Rugby season by team
2019 in South African rugby union